Register Rock, near American Falls, Idaho, is a historic site where many Oregon Trail emigrants carved their names on a rock.  The rock is located in what is now Massacre Rocks State Park and is now protected by a shelter.

It is located west of American Falls on U.S. Route 30 and Interstate 86.  It was listed on the National Register of Historic Places in 1978.

References 

Transportation on the National Register of Historic Places in Idaho
Power County, Idaho
Road transportation on the National Register of Historic Places
National Register of Historic Places in Power County, Idaho